The 2013–14 season was Real Sociedad's 67th season in La Liga. Real Sociedad finished 7th in the league and reached the semifinals of the Copa del Rey. The Basque failed to make it out of the group stages of the UEFA Champions League.

Season summary
Philippe Montanier, who left for Rennes, was replaced by Jagoba Arrasate, his assistant manager. The club's pre-season was marked by the shock sale of Asier Illarramendi to Real Madrid. Real Sociedad lost the player that had been its most influential midfielder during the previous season. The club signed Haris Seferovic, Esteban Granero and José Ángel on loan.

Participation in the UEFA Champions League
In the Champions League preliminary round draw, Real Sociedad were not seeded and were to face seeded opponents from Europe's biggest leagues. They were drawn against Lyon, with the second leg to be played in Anoeta. Preparations for the  Champions league play-off round were marked by the long-term injuries of Mikel González, Imanol Agirretxe and Diego Ifrán.

Pre-season consisted of matches against lower division Basque clubs, Sporting CP and English clubs. These matches were disappointing for Real Sociedad in both results and quality of play.

The first official game of the season was played at home against Getafe. The Madrilians were easily beaten a few days before travelling to Lyon. At the Stade Gerland, Real Sociedad inflicted the hosts a shock defeat with a 0–2 result. After an unremarkable draw at Elche that weekend, Real Sociedad welcomed Lyon. Once again, the French were convincingly beaten with a 2–0 scoreline, thus securing progression to the 2013–14 Champions League group stage for the Basques.

With no European participations in its five preceding seasons, Real Sociedad were seeded in pot 4. In the draw, they grouped with Manchester United, Shakhtar Donetsk and Bayer Leverkusen, the first two clubs being holding champions of their respective leagues.

The Champions League had a bitter outcome for Real Sociedad. The first two matches were fairly balanced, but late goals in both games meant being bottom right before a double confrontation with Manchester United. As expected, Real Sociedad was comprehensively outplayed in both matches against the Red Devils. However, they only conceded one goal, in Manchester. With a single point after four matches, their chances of surviving this stage looked slim, eventually losing their last two matches.

Copa del rey
Thanks to being in the Champions League Real Sociedad entered the second pot in the Copa del Rey. This meant they faced an opponent from Segunda División B or Tercera División in the round of 32. Algeciras was easily beaten on a 5–1 aggregate while resting some of the main players. In the quarterfinals Real Sociedad faced Villareal. Both sides played with many substitutes in their starting lineups. Real Sociedad went through on a 0–1 aggregate score. A bizarre tie against Racing de Santander followed. The Cantabrians refused to play the second leg unless their club's governing body resigned. The match wasn't played and Real sociedad advanced to the next round. Barcelona awaited in the semi-finals, in a prestigious tie that was eventually won by the Catalans. Refereeing in the first leg was surrounded by controversy.

Reaching the semifinals was the best performance in the cup since 1988.

League
In the league Real Sociedad started slowly but stabilized in the sixth position in late November. Exiting European competition only helped the club, focusing efforts on domestic duties. The last game played in 2013 was the derby against Athletic Bilbao. Real Sociedad emerged victorious from a very physical battle. At that point it seemed like Real Sociedad would fight for fourth spot with Athletic Bilbao. An emphatic 5–1 demolition at the hands of Villarreal right after the derby created doubts.

January and February
January and February were very positive and fourth spot still appeared attainable. The highlight of this period was the convincing 3–1 victory over Barcelona in Anoeta. This happened after Barcelona's controversial victory in the Copa del Rey and was seen by many as a revenge.

March and onwards
In March, the team's performances worsened drastically and the Basques unexpectedly lost to Rayo Vallecano at home (2–3) and Almería away (4–3). Athletic Bilbao comfortably ensured fourth place and Real Sociedad found itself in a fight to avoid seventh place against Villareal and Sevilla. Defeat to Villareal on the last matchday meant Real Sociedad finished seventh and had to play third qualifying round of the UEFA Europa League in July 2014.

During this season, Real Sociedad played more matches than ever in its history. This and the early preparations for the Champions League preliminary round were suggested to be behind the drop in stamina that happened from March onwards.

The performances of Carlos Vela and Antoine Griezmann were the highlight of the season. These two ended up as joint top goal scorers and made the difference in many matches.

Others
In November 2013, Real Sociedad and Kazakh club Astana signed a cooperation agreement.

On 20 January 2014, it was announced that Carlos Vela had won the La Liga Player of the Month for December and Arrasate the La Liga Manager of the Month. In April 2014, Arrasate had his contract renewed until 2016.

In 2014, Real Sociedad were awarded the 2013–14 Liga BBVA Fair Play Club prize at the 2014 LFP Awards Ceremony.

Annual general meeting
In December 2013, the annual general meeting took place. In addition to approving the new budget and the previous year's accounts a governing body had to be voted. This has to be done every five years and Jokin Aperribay had been voted in during 2008. As expected, Aperribay and the rest of the governing body were comfortably re-elected.

Squad

Start formations
Starting XI
Lineup that started most of the club's competitive matches throughout the season.

Player transfers

In

Total expenditure: €2 million

Out

Technical staff

Competitions

Legend

Pre-season and friendlies

La Liga

League table

Results summary

Results by round

Matches

Copa del Rey

Round of 32

Round of 16

Quarter-finals

Semi-finals

UEFA Champions League

Play-off round

Group stage

Statistics

Goals

Assists

Discipline

See also

 2013–14 Copa del Rey
 2013–14 La Liga
 2013–14 UEFA Champions League

Sources

External links 
 

Spanish football clubs 2013–14 season
Real Sociedad
Real Sociedad seasons